The St. Joseph's Hospital in Lewistown, Montana, on U.S. Route 87, was started in 1906 and grew over the years through extensions and additions of service buildings through 1953. It was listed on the National Register of Historic Places in 1978.

It is a complex which overlooks Lewistown from a hill.  Its central section, the original portion, is a two-and-a-half-story sandstone building.

Its history involved nuns from France.

References

External links
St. Joseph's Hospital, 1903-53, continues on m

National Register of Historic Places in Fergus County, Montana
Hospital buildings completed in 1906
1906 establishments in Montana
Sandstone buildings in the United States
Hospital buildings on the National Register of Historic Places in Montana